The Royal Hamilton College of Music was a Canadian music conservatory in Hamilton, Ontario that was actively providing higher education in music during the late 19th century and 20th century. The college was founded as the Hamilton Conservatory of Music in 1897 by C. L. M. Harris, who served as the school's first director through 1907. From 1904 until its closing in 1980 due to financial reasons the school was located at premises on James St South. In 1906 the school became affiliated with the University of Toronto through which the school awarded Bachelor of Music degrees through 1918. The school also offered its own associate, licentiate, and fellow diplomas and offered bachelor's degrees through the University of Trinity College, thereby offering three different examination systems during its history. In 1907 J. E. P. Aldous, Bruce Carey, and W. H. Hewlett became co-directors of the college. Hewlett became sole director in 1918, a position he held until 1939. Other directors of the college included Cyril Hampshire (1939–44), Reginald Bedford (1944-8), Reginald Godden (1948–53), Lorne Betts (1953–59), Harold Jerome (1959–67), Gladys Whitehead (1967–74), and Jonathan Watts (1974–80).

In its heyday the Conservatory boasted a faculty of 60 and a student enrollment of more than 1,000. In the late 1970s the Hamilton Conservatory of Music experienced severe financial problems. Despite the concerted efforts of the community the HCM closed in 1980. The building was converted to other uses and then abandoned; losing its connection as a cultural center. In 1997 the building was purchased by Vitek Wincza. It was re-opened as the Hamilton Conservatory for the Arts with a vision of a place where music, dance and the visual arts could exist, intermingle and flourish together.  In so doing he hoped to put the arts community back in touch with its proud past while creating a cornerstone of an exciting future. Since its re-opening the Hamilton Conservatory for the Art has become a vibrant, all arts educational facility that offers over 100 arts programs for people of all ages. In addition to the school, HCA’s charitable arm, Culture for Kids in the Arts, is dedicated to providing arts education to young people across Hamilton, regardless of their financial circumstances.  HCA is also home to a variety of professional arts activities including the HCA Piano Concert Series, HCA Gallery and HCA Dance Theatre and hosts Guitar Hamilton and other guest events year-round.

References

See also 
:Category:Academic staff of the Royal Hamilton College of Music

Classical music in Canada
Educational institutions established in 1897
Educational institutions disestablished in 1980
Music schools in Canada
Defunct universities and colleges in Canada
1897 establishments in Ontario